XHENA-FM is a Mexican radio station in Ensenada, Baja California. It is owned by MVS Radio and carries its regional Mexican La Mejor format.

History
XHENA came on the air in 1994, creating a duopoly with XHADA, which had signed on three years earlier. Like many of MVS's Baja California stations, it was originally owned by Carlos Armando Madrazo Pintado's Sociedad Mexicana de Radio de Baja California (being transferred to the company itself in 1999). MVS quickly bought SOMER Baja California and later dissolved the concessionaire.

References

Radio stations in Ensenada, Baja California
Radio stations established in 1994
MVS Radio
1994 establishments in Mexico